Antoine-George-Prosper Marilhat, usually known as Prosper Marilhat, (26 March 1811 – 13 September 1847) was a French Orientalist painter. Many of his most successful works were based on the sketches he drew during the time he spent in Egypt in 1831–1832.

Early life

He was born in Vertaizon. Encouraged by local artists, Marihat began painting at an early age. Although his parents wanted him to work in the cutlery business of Thiers, Puy-de-Dôme where he lived, the Baron de Barante convinced them he was more suited to an artistic career. He went to Paris in 1829 where he studied under Camille Roqueplan, exhibiting for the first time at the Paris Salon in 1831 with his Site d'Auvergne.

Career

In May 1831, Marilhat was invited by Charles von Hügel to join him on a lengthy expedition but he only accompanied him as far as Alexandria. Over the following months, from October 1831 to May 1833, he completed ten albums of sketches there which would form the basis of his later paintings. In 1835, he travelled through Italy and spent 1836 in Provence. He exhibited in all the Paris Salons from 1837 to 1841 as well as at the Salon of 1844. While he specialized in architectural paintings and landscapes, he also painted portraits including one of his friend Théodore Chassériau which is now in the Louvre.

From 1840 to 1844, Marilhat painted a number of works inspired by his travels including Ruines de la mosquée El-Hakem au Caire, said to have captured the monumentality of the ruins and the romanticism of the location. Theophile Gautier was deeply moved by his Place de l’Esbekieh au Caire, remarking: "On seeing this painting, I became sick at heart, and yearned for the Orient, in which I had not yet set foot." At the Salon of 1844, his Souvenir des bords du Nil was praised, as was Arabes syriens en voyage, now in the Musée Condé, Chantilly.

Marilhat's work falls into three periods: his early traditional landscapes and portraits, the drawings and sketches during his travels to the Orient, and his paintings after 1838 which, in addition to his well-received oriental works also included mythological subjects. Suffering from syphilis, Prosper Marilhat became insane and died in a Paris asylum in September 1847, only 36 years old.

Works

Site d'Auvergne (1831)
La place de l'Esbekieh (1834)
Intérieur d'un village, environs de Thiers (1835)
Souvenir de la Campagne de Rosette (Gold Medal, 1835)
Scène pastorale (1837)
Pont du Gard (1838)
Nymphes dans une clairière (1839)
Les Jardins d'Armide (1839)
Le delta (1839)
Ruines d'une ancienne mosquée dans la ville des Tombeaux au Caire (1840)
Une caravane arrêtée dans les ruines de Balbek (1840)
Souvenirs des environs de Beyrouth (1841)
Vue de la Place de l'Esbekieh au Caire (1844)
Café à Boulak (1844)
La Mosquée Babel-Wase (1844)
Tombeaux arabes à Salmiè (1844)
Village près de Rosette (1844)
Souvenir des bords du Nil (1844)
Arabes syriens en voyage (1844)
Souvenirs des environs de Thiers (1844)

See also

List of Orientalist artists
Orientalism

References

Sources and further reading
 Roger Bonniot, Le peintre auvergnat Prosper Marilhat; étude iconographiques, in Revue "L'Auvergne Littéraire" pp. 3–28, No 191, 4th quarter 1966.
 Édouard Charton, Marilhat, paysagiste. Fragments de ses lettres inédites, in "Le Magasin Pittoresque", 1856, pp. 347–350, 370–371, 403–404.
 A. Delafoulhouze, « Notice sur Prosper Marilhat, peintre de paysage », in "Bulletin Historique et Scientifique de l’Auvergne", 1862, tome IV, pp. 27–49.
 Hippolyte Gomot, Marilhat et son œuvre, Impr. Mont-Louis, Clermont-Ferrand, 1884, 101p. Online text from Gallica.
 Marie-Laure Hallopeau, Prosper Marilhat : Peintures, Dessins, Gravures, Catalogue de l'exposition au Musée Bargoin, juin - Septembre 1973, 32p., ill., La Source d'Or & Le Centre de Recherches Révolutionnaires et Romantiques, 1973.
 Danièle Menu, Prosper Marilhat (1811-1847). Essai de Catalogue, Mémoire de maîtrise, Faculté des Lettres de Dijon, manuscrit, 1972 (près de 250 œuvres recensées).
 Serge Trouillet, Prosper Marilhat, Peintre de la ligne et du soleil, in Revue "Un, Deux... Quatre", pp. 1–19, ill., No 156, 07/01/1998 au 20/01/1998.
 

19th-century French painters
French male painters
1811 births
1847 deaths
People from Puy-de-Dôme
French orientalists
Orientalist painters
19th-century French male artists